Stanislas Victor Edouard Lépine (October 3, 1835 – September 28, 1892) was a French painter who specialized in landscapes, especially views of the Seine.

Biography
Lépine was born in Caen. An important influence in his artistic formation was Corot, whom he met in Normandy in 1859, becoming his student the following year.

Lépine's favorite subject was the Seine, which he was to paint in all its aspects for the rest of his life.  He participated in the first Impressionist exhibition, held at Nadar's in 1874, although he is generally not considered an Impressionist. His paintings are placid in mood and are usually small in scale. Lépine was awarded the First Prize medal at the Exposition of 1889. He died suddenly in Paris in 1892.

External links 
 
 Stanislas Lépine – Rehs Galleries' biography on the artist and an image of his painting Navires au Porte.

1835 births
1892 deaths
19th-century French painters
French male painters
Artists from Caen
19th-century French male artists